Noise Unit is a Canadian industrial band, founded by Bill Leeb of Front Line Assembly as a side project. The band has seen several changes in line-up, with Bill Leeb being the only permanent member.

History
Noise Unit's first album, Grinding into Emptiness, arose from the collaboration between Leeb and Marc Verhaeghen of Belgian industrial band Klinik. It was released in 1989 through Wax Trax! and Antler-Subway.

The 1990 album Response Frequency included Rhys Fulber. After the completion of the album, Verhaeghen left Noise Unit for several years.  Fulber remained with the band for the next three releases, including the contemporary techno album Decoder in 1995.

Verhaeghen resumed his collaboration with Noise Unit for the 1996 album Drill, which also featured members of German industrial band Haujobb.

After an eight-year hiatus, Leeb teamed with former Front Line Assembly member Chris Peterson in 2004 to release Voyeur in 2005. Jason Filipchuk and Michael Balch also contributed to the album. The album peaked at #4 on the German Alternative Charts (DAC) and ranked #26 on the DAC Top Albums of 2005.

In 2016, Canadian label Artoffact reissued the albums Grinding Into Emptiness, Response Frequency and Drill on vinyl and CD.

Deviator
In May 2020, it was announced that Rhys Fulber and Bill Leeb were working on a new Noise Unit album, the first in 15 years. On November 24, 2020, album title Deviator and cover were revealed. The cover art was created by Dave McKean. In May 2021, Artoffact scheduled the release date for September 17 the same year and made the second album track "Body Aktiv" available to the public via Bandcamp. The album will contain ten tracks and feature Raymond Watts on the track "Atrocity Obsession". In July 2021, Artoffact released a lyric video for this track on their YouTube channel.

Cheeba City Blues
In July 2022, Artoffact announced the release of a new Noise Unit album titled Cheeba City Blues for October 21, 2022. The announcement coincided with the release of the single Alone Again, co-written by former member Jeremy Inkel before his death in January 2018.  One month later the band followed up with the release of the second single Dub it Up.

Discography

Albums
 Grinding Into Emptiness (1989, Wax Trax!, Antler-Subway)
 Response Frequency (1990, Antler-Subway)
 Strategy of Violence (1992, Dossier, Cleopatra)
 Decoder (1995, Dossier, Cleopatra)
 Drill (1996, Off Beat, Metropolis)
 Voyeur (2005, Metropolis)
 Deviator (2021, Artoffact)
 Cheeba City Blues (2022, Artoffact)

Singles
 "Deceit" / "Struktur" (1989, Wax Trax!, Antler-Subway)
 "Agitate" / "In Vain" (1990, Antler-Subway)

References 

Canadian industrial music groups
Musical groups established in 1989
Musical groups from Vancouver
Wax Trax! Records artists
Metropolis Records artists
Off Beat label artists
1989 establishments in British Columbia